The 2021 World RX of Sweden was the second round of the eighth season of the FIA World Rallycross Championship. The event was held at the Höljesbanan in Värmland, Sweden. The first round of the RX1 class, and the second round of the RX3 class in the 2021 FIA European Rallycross Championship were also held at the event.

Heats

World RX1 Championship

RX2e Championship

European RX1 Championship

European RX3 Championship

Semi-finals

World RX1 Championship

Semi-Final 1

Semi-Final 2

RX2e Championship

Semi-Final 1

Semi-Final 2

European RX1 Championship

Semi-Final 1

Semi-Final 2

European RX3 Championship

Semi-Final 1

Semi-Final 2

Finals

World RX1 Championship

RX2e Championship

European RX1 Championship

European RX3 Championship

Standings after the event

World RX1 Championship

RX2e Championship

European RX1 Championship

European RX3 Championship 

 Note: Only the top five positions are included.

Notes

References 

|- style="text-align:center"
|width="35%"|Previous race:2021 World RX of Barcelona-Catalunya
|width="40%"|FIA World Rallycross Championship2021 season
|width="35%"|Next race:2021 World RX of France
|- style="text-align:center"
|width="35%"|Previous race:2020 World RX of Sweden
|width="40%"|World RX of Sweden
|width="35%"|Next race:-
|- style="text-align:center"

Sweden
World RX of Sweden